War Without Mercy: Race & Power In the Pacific War is a 1986 history book written by John W. Dower and published by W. W. Norton & Company.  The book covers the views of the Japanese and their Western adversaries during the Pacific War, with a particular focus on the United States.

Overview
In War Without Mercy, Dower – who is an emeritus professor at MIT – casts light on the racist foundation of the Second World War. In describing World War II as a race war, Dower provides details as widely varying as "songs, slogans, propaganda reports, secret documents, Hollywood movies, the mass media and quotes from soldiers, leader and politicians". 

Dower contrasts western racism towards Japanese people with attitudes towards Germans/Nazis – in the US, Germans overall were differentiated from Nazis. That differentiation was not complete or perfect, but even so it was different from the attitudes towards the entire Japanese people. Immediately after Pearl Harbor (itself part of the reason for the intensity of anti-Japanese sentiment), the U.S. government incarcerated Japanese-Americans in concentration camps, despite the lack of any evidence of any organized activity on the part of Japan within the U.S. Japanese community. Meanwhile the German American Bund had openly supported Hitler right up to the declaration of war.

With concrete examples and excruciating detail, Dower illuminates the painful depths of racism, and shows how destructive its real world impacts can be. In the final section, Dower explains how a kind of 'normalcy' of viewpoints was re-established; and how much fragility still exists within our current relations. "They [racist stereotypes] remain latent, capable of being revived by both sides in times of crisis and tension."

Sections
War Without Mercy is divided into four sections. The first section describes the patterns of a race war. The second and third part are a matched set: Part II covers the war from a Western viewpoint, while Part III relays the war as seen by Japanese eyes. Kitano says "The point-counterpoint scenario, as the two cultures misunderstand, mis-perceived, misinterpret and attempt to justify the destruction of each other is skillfully done." The final part is an epilogue, explaining how those intense viewpoints subsided, but may not have entirely disappeared.

References

Publication
Total pages: 399.

History books about World War II
Books about Japan
Occupied Japan
1986 non-fiction books
W. W. Norton & Company books
Internment of Japanese Americans